The None of the Above Direct Democracy Party (NOTA), formerly and still unofficially called the None of the Above Party, is a minor political party in the province of Ontario, Canada. It is named after the expression "none of the above" and was founded in 2014 by Greg Vezina in response to his disillusionment with the current major political parties. The party aims to "elect independent MPPs who are not bound by party control and who truly can represent their constituents first". It supports the use of referendums, term limits and recall elections.

NOTA nominated candidates in eight ridings in the 2014 provincial election: Vezina ran in Mississauga—Erindale, Vezina's wife Kathleen ran in Mississauga—Brampton South, Vezina's son Alexander ran in Mississauga—Streetsville, Vezina's brother Matthew ran in Parkdale—High Park, Andrew Weber ran in Mississauga South, Amir Khan ran in Scarborough—Rouge River, John Ringo Beam ran in Niagara Falls, and Bob Lewis ran in Lambton—Kent—Middlesex. None of the candidates gained a seat in the Legislative Assembly of Ontario and the party received 0.09% of the popular vote. The party failed to win any seats in the 2022 Ontario general election.

Election results

See also
List of political parties in Ontario

References

External links
Official Website

Provincial political parties in Ontario
Organizations based in Mississauga
2014 establishments in Ontario
Political parties established in 2014
Direct democracy parties